The Selz is a river in Rhineland-Palatinate, Germany, and a left hand tributary of the Rhine. It flows through the largest German wine region,  Rheinhessen (Rhenish Hesse).

It rises near the village of Orbis in the county of Donnersbergkreis, crosses the border from the Palatinate into Rhenish Hesse and after about  the town of Alzey in the Alzey-Worms district. There the river passes a pond, and disappears underground, flowing through ditches under the town.

Despite its low, and often irregular water flow, the Selz is regarded as the main river in the rather dry rolling countryside of Rhenish Hesse. During periods of low water, its waters consist of a significant amount of clean effluent from sewage farms.

Environmental restoration 
For a number of decades of the 20th century there was a lot canalisation of rivers and streams in Germany. As a result of this river straightening process that was carried out between 1958 and 1963, the Selz stream was constricted between embankments and flows in a relatively meandering course through the plain between the famous rolling hills of Rhenish Hesse. In order to prevent river bed degradation and to improve both biodiversity and flood protection, the local nature conservation association (Selztalverband) and the district of Mainz-Bingen managed a revitalization of the Selz over a considerable length between Hahnheim, Undenheim and Sörgenloch.

The loss of the floodplain and shorter sections of river caused higher water levels and risk of flood than in the past. Some floods that nearly caused a disaster were the reason for a restoration concept. The concept includes flood protection, river bed stabilization and renaturization measures. The main objectives are:
 
 flood protection up to a 100-year flood
 improvement of the ecological situation
 stabilizing river bed/erosion control
 stabilizing groundwater level

Nature is allowed to develop undisturbed in biotopes, which protect and promote the biodiversity of the landscape with its meadows, ditches, bank slopes, marsh areas, wetland, Phragmites, willows, hedges and boundary ridges. During the past 25 years, the village of Hahnheim has planted 27,000 trees and hedges along the Selz within its boundaries.

Since the Selz renaturation project covers several miles of the Selz's riverbank, it has increased the overall length of the river.

Tributaries 
 Weidas
 Heimersheimer Bach

Settlements 

The following villages and towns are located on the Selz (from source to mouth):
 Orbis
 Morschheim
 Mauchenheim
 Alzey
 
 Framersheim (confluence  of Weidas and Selz)
 
 Gau-Odernheim
 Bechtolsheim
 Undenheim
 Friesenheim
 Köngernheim
 Selzen
 Hahnheim
 Sörgenloch
 Nieder-Olm, the reason for the foundation of Nieder-Olm is given by the passage of an old Roman road over the Selz river which led to the Roman camps around Mainz and the city itself.
 Stadecken-Elsheim
 Bubenheim
 Schwabenheim an der Selz
 
 Ingelheim am Rhein

Cycle track 

Both trackbeds now have a tarmac surface. Sometimes the cycle path along the river bed may be used in dry weather. Both routes are covered by tall trees, shading the cycleway from the hot sun.

See also 
List of rivers of Rhineland-Palatinate

External links 

 restoring Selz River 
  

Rivers of Rhineland-Palatinate
Wine regions of Germany
North Palatinate
Rivers of Germany